The 9th constituency of Yvelines is a French legislative constituency in the Yvelines département.

Description

The 9th constituency of Yvelines is one of the larger constituencies in the department and covers its western territory including the border with Eure-et-Loir.

The seat was created in 1988 and since then has continuously elected conservative deputies. The seat was left vacant in 2011 following the elevation of Sophie Primas to the France.

Historic Representation

Election results

2022

 
 
 
 
 
 
 
 
 
|-
| colspan="8" bgcolor="#E9E9E9"|
|-

2017

 
 
 
 
 
 
 
|-
| colspan="8" bgcolor="#E9E9E9"|
|-

2012

 
 
 
 
|-
| colspan="8" bgcolor="#E9E9E9"|
|-

2007

 
 
 
 
 
 
 
|-
| colspan="8" bgcolor="#E9E9E9"|
|-

2002

 
 
 
 
|-
| colspan="8" bgcolor="#E9E9E9"|
|-

1997

 
 
 
 
 
 
 
 
|-
| colspan="8" bgcolor="#E9E9E9"|
|-

Sources
Official results of French elections from 2002: "Résultats électoraux officiels en France" (in French).

9